This is a list of 436 species in Limonia, a genus of limoniid crane flies in the family Limoniidae.

Limonia species

 Limonia acaenophora Alexander, 1978 c g
 Limonia acerba Alexander, 1943 i
 Limonia achates Alexander, 1972 c g
 Limonia acinacis Alexander, 1965 c g
 Limonia acinomeca Alexander, 1968 i
 Limonia acutissima Alexander, 1968 c g
 Limonia adirondacensis (Alexander, 1922) i
 Limonia advena Alexander i g
 Limonia affinis (Zetterstedt, 1838) w
 Limonia alascaensis (Alexander, 1919) i
 Limonia albifrons (Meigen, 1818) c g
 Limonia albipes (Senior-White, 1924) c g
 Limonia alboangusta Alexander, 1972 c g
 Limonia alienata Alexander, 1948 c g
 Limonia alopecura Alexander, 1935 c g
 Limonia alpicola (Lackschewitz, 1928) w
 Limonia amabilis amabilis Alexander, 1924 w
 Limonia amabilis antistes Alexander, 1938 w
 Limonia amabilis Alexander, 1924 c g
 Limonia amblymera Alexander, 1967 c g
 Limonia amicula (Alexander, 1921) c g
 Limonia analis (Meigen, 1818) w
 Limonia angulosa Alexander, 1966 c g
 Limonia annulata Linnaeus, 1758 i c g b
 Limonia annulus (Meigen) i
 Limonia anteapicalis Alexander, 1946 i
 Limonia anteterminalis Alexander, 1965 c g
 Limonia anthracina (Alexander, 1922) c
 Limonia apicalis  g
 Limonia apicata (Alexander) i g
 Limonia apiceglabra Alexander, 1968 i
 Limonia aquilina Stary, 1984 c g
 Limonia aquita (Dietz, 1915) i
 Limonia argenteceps (Alexander, 1912) i
 Limonia argopoda Alexander, 1960 c g
 Limonia arthritica Alexander, 1936 c g
 Limonia atayal Alexander, 1929 g
 Limonia athabascae (Alexander, 1927) i
 Limonia atnitta Theischinger, 1994 c g
 Limonia atridorsum (Alexander, 1920) c g
 Limonia atrisoma Alexander, 1940 c g
 Limonia atroaurata Alexander, 1931 c g
 Limonia atwatye Theischinger, 2000 c g
 Limonia aureolenta Alexander, 1948 c g
 Limonia ayodhya Alexander, 1966 c g
 Limonia badia (Walker, 1848) i c g
 Limonia bagobo Alexander, 1931 c g
 Limonia bidens Savchenko, 1979 c g
 Limonia bifaria Alexander, 1965 c g
 Limonia bilan Alexander, 1931 c g
 Limonia bilobulifera Alexander, 1931 c g
 Limonia bipendula Alexander, 1978 c g
 Limonia bistigma (Coquillett, 1905) i c g
 Limonia borealis (Doane, 1900) i c g
 Limonia bougainvilleana Alexander, 1971 c g
 Limonia brachylabis Alexander, 1965 c g
 Limonia brevivena (Osten Sacken, 1969) i
 Limonia brevivenula Alexander, 1929 i
 Limonia brunettiella Alexander, 1929 c g
 Limonia brunnea (Doane, 1900) i g
 Limonia bryaniana Alexander, 1929 c g
 Limonia bryanti (Johnson, 1909) i
 Limonia cairnensis (Alexander, 1921) c
 Limonia calcarifera Alexander, 1936 c g
 Limonia californica (Osten Sacken, 1861) i
 Limonia canadensis (Westwood, 1835) i
 Limonia catalinae Alexander, 1944 i
 Limonia caucasica Lackschewitz, 1940 c g
 Limonia cervina (Doane, 1908) i
 Limonia chaseni Edwards, 1933 c g
 Limonia chillcotti Alexander, 1968 i
 Limonia chorea (Meigen, 1818) i
 Limonia cinctipes Say i b
 Limonia cinctiventris (Brunetti, 1912) c g
 Limonia citrina (Doane, 1900) i
 Limonia citrofocalis (Edwards, 1926) c g
 Limonia clitelligera Alexander, 1929 g
 Limonia commelina Alexander, 1946 i
 Limonia communis (Osten Sacken, 1859) i b
 Limonia confinis (Brunetti, 1918) w
 Limonia congesta Alexander, 1967 c g
 Limonia costalis (Wiedemann, 1824) c g
 Limonia cramptoniana Alexander, 1929 i g
 Limonia ctenopyga Alexander, 1943 i
 Limonia dactylolabis (Alexander, 1921) c g
 Limonia dampfi (Alexander, 1925) i g
 Limonia deceptor Alexander, 1956 c g
 Limonia decurvans Alexander, 1959 c g
 Limonia defuncta (Osten Sacken, 1859) i
 Limonia desiderata Alexander, 1932 c g
 Limonia devata Alexander, 1965 c g
 Limonia dietziana Alexander, 1927 i
 Limonia dilutior (Edwards, 1921) c g
 Limonia dilutissima Alexander, 1933 c g
 Limonia dipinax Alexander, 1948 c g
 Limonia distans (Psten Sacken, 1859) i
 Limonia distincta (Doane, 1900) i
 Limonia distivena Alexander, 1935 c g
 Limonia diversoides (Dietz, 1921) i g
 Limonia divisa Alexander, 1929 i
 Limonia domestica Osten Sacken, 1859 i g b
 Limonia dreisbachi Alexander, 1965 i
 Limonia duplicata (Doane, 1900) i b
 Limonia ectopa Alexander, 1967 c g
 Limonia edax Alexander, 1961 c g
 Limonia edura Alexander, 1935 c g
 Limonia egesta Alexander, 1948 c g
 Limonia elephantella Alexander, 1972 c g
 Limonia elephantina Alexander, 1940 c g
 Limonia enormis Stary, 2017 w
 Limonia eos Stary and Savchenko, 1976 c g
 Limonia episema Alexander, 1924 c g
 Limonia erugata Alexander, 1978 c g
 Limonia esakii (Alexander, 1922) c
 Limonia evittata (Edwards, 1926) c g
 Limonia exosa Alexander, 1930 w
 Limonia expedita Alexander, 1936 c g
 Limonia fallax (Johnson, 1909) i
 Limonia festiva (Brunetti, 1912) c g
 Limonia fidelis Osten Sacken i g
 Limonia filicauda (Alexander, 1925) i
 Limonia firestonei Alexander, 1930 c g
 Limonia flavescens (Macquart, 1834) w
 Limonia flavipes (Fabricius, 1787) c g
 Limonia flavoterminalis (Alexander, 1922) c g
 Limonia floridana (Osten Sacken, 1869) i
 Limonia fraudulenta Alexander, 1928 c g
 Limonia fullowayi (Alexander, 1915) g
 Limonia fulva (Doane, 1900) i
 Limonia fusca Meigen, 1804 i
 Limonia fusciceps Alexander, 1924 c g
 Limonia fuscofemorata (von Roser, 1840) w
 Limonia garoana Oosterbroek, 2009 c g
 Limonia gaspicola Alexander, 1941 i
 Limonia geronimo Alexander, 1949 i
 Limonia geyserensis Alexander, 1943 i
 Limonia gibsoni (Alexander, 1929) i
 Limonia gissarica Savchenko, 1979 c g
 Limonia gladiator (Osten Sacken, 1859) i
 Limonia globithorax (Osten Sacken, 1969) i
 Limonia goodenoughensis Alexander, 1978 c g
 Limonia gracilis (Wiedemann, 1828) w
 Limonia graciosa Alexander, 1978 c g
 Limonia grimshawi (Alexander) i
 Limonia guatemalensis (Alexander, 1916) i
 Limonia guerrernesis Alexander, 1916 i g
 Limonia habra Alexander, 1972 c g
 Limonia haeretica (Osten Sacken, 1869) i
 Limonia halterata (Osten Sacken, 1869) i
 Limonia halterella (Edwards, 1921) i
 Limonia hartveldae Stary, 2017 w
 Limonia hawaiiensis (Grimshaw) i
 Limonia hebridicola Alexander, 1948 c g
 Limonia helva (Doane, 1900) i g
 Limonia hera Alexander, 1948 c g
 Limonia hercegovinae (Strobl, 1898) c g
 Limonia hians Alexander, 1967 c g
 Limonia homichlophila Alexander, 1958 i
 Limonia hostilis Alexander, 1933 c g
 Limonia huachucensis Alexander, 1955 i
 Limonia hudsonica (Osten Sacken, 1861) i b
 Limonia humidicola (Osten Sacken, 1859) i b
 Limonia ibis (Alexander, 1916) i
 Limonia illustris Alexander, 1944 i
 Limonia immanis Alexander, 1950 i
 Limonia immatura (Osten Sacken, 1859) i b
 Limonia immodesta (Osten Sacken, 1859) i
 Limonia immodestoides Alexander, 1919 i g
 Limonia inconsiderata Alexander, 1956 c g
 Limonia indigena indigena (Osten Sacken, 1860) w
 Limonia indigena jacksoni (Alexander, 1917) w
 Limonia indigena loloensis Alexander, 1958 w
 Limonia indigena Osten Sacken i c g b
 Limonia indigenoides (Alexander, 1920) i
 Limonia infantula Edwards, 1931 c g
 Limonia infausta Alexander, 1930 c g
 Limonia infuscata (Doane, 1900) i
 Limonia inhabilis Alexander, 1949 i
 Limonia iniquispina Hardy i
 Limonia innoxia Alexander, 1968 i
 Limonia insitiva Alexander, 1951 c g
 Limonia insolabilis Alexander, 1946 i
 Limonia interjecta Stary, 1974 c g
 Limonia intermedia Garrett, 1922 i g
 Limonia intricata (Alexander, 1927) i
 Limonia involuta Alexander, 1968 i
 Limonia iowensis Alexander, 1927 i g
 Limonia iridescens (Edwards, 1912) c g
 Limonia isabellina (Doane, 1900) i
 Limonia jacobus (Alexander) i
 Limonia japonica (Alexander, 1913) c
 Limonia juvenca Alexander, 1935 c g
 Limonia karafutonis Alexander, 1924 c g
 Limonia kashmirica (Edwards, 1927) c g
 Limonia kauaiensis (Grimshaw) i
 Limonia kernensis Alexander, 1966 i
 Limonia knabi (Alexander, 1912) i
 Limonia kraussi Alexander i g
 Limonia kumbu Theischinger, 1994 c g
 Limonia kuschei Alexander, 1958 i c g
 Limonia labuana Edwards, 1931 c g
 Limonia lackschewitziana Alexander, 1933 c g
 Limonia lacroixi (Alexander, 1926) i
 Limonia laistes Alexander, 1967 i
 Limonia lateroflava Alexander, 1971 c g
 Limonia lateromacula Edwards, 1933 c g
 Limonia latiorflava Alexander, 1966 c g
 Limonia latipennis (Macquart, 1834) w
 Limonia laufferi (Strobl, 1906) w
 Limonia lecontei Alexander, 1940 i
 Limonia liberta (Osten Sacken, 1859) i b
 Limonia libertoides (Alexander, 1912) i
 Limonia lindbergi Nielsen, 1962 c g
 Limonia linsdalei Alexander, 1943 i
 Limonia livida (Say, 1829) i
 Limonia longeantennata Alexander, 1936 c g
 Limonia longipennis (Schummel, 1829) i
 Limonia longivena (Edwards, 1911) c g
 Limonia luteipostica Alexander, 1965 c g
 Limonia luteivittata Alexander, 1930 c g
 Limonia lyssa Alexander, 1967 c g
 Limonia macateei (Alexander, 1916) i c g
 Limonia macrostigma (Schummel, 1829) c g
 Limonia maculata (Meigen, 1804 ) b
 Limonia maculicosta (Coquillett, 1905) i c g
 Limonia maculipennis (Meigen, 1818) c g
 Limonia marginata (Macquart, 1826) w
 Limonia marginepunctata (von Roser, 1840) w
 Limonia marmorata Osten Sacken, 1861 i b
 Limonia masoni (Edwards, 1921) w
 Limonia melanocera (Alexander, 1925) i
 Limonia melleicauda (Alexander, 1917) i
 Limonia messaurea boreoorientalis Savchenko, 1987 w
 Limonia messaurea Mendl, 1971 c g
 Limonia metatarsalba (Alexander, 1923) c g
 Limonia michigana Alexander, 1950 i
 Limonia microlabis (Edwards, 1926) c g
 Limonia micropyga Alexander, 1954 c g
 Limonia modesta (Meigen, 1818) i
 Limonia moniliformis (Doane, 1900) i
 Limonia monilis Alexander, 1932 c g
 Limonia morioides (Osten Sacken, 1860) i
 Limonia mouicola Alexander, 1948 c g
 Limonia murcida Alexander, 1967 c g
 Limonia murina (Zetterstedt, 1851) i
 Limonia nebulinervis Alexander, 1966 c g
 Limonia nebulosa (Zetterstedt, 1838) w
 Limonia negativa Edwards, 1933 c g
 Limonia nelliana (Alexander, 1914) i
 Limonia nemoralis Savchenko, 1983 c g
 Limonia neoelegans Alexander, 1954 i
 Limonia neoindigena Alexander, 1924 c g
 Limonia neomorio (Alexander, 1927) i
 Limonia neonebulosa Alexander, 1924 i
 Limonia nielseniana Alexander, 1949 i
 Limonia nifrithorax (Brunetti, 1912) g
 Limonia nigrella Alexander, 1929 c g
 Limonia nigrescens (Lackschewitz, 1928) w
 Limonia nigricans Alexander, 1929 w
 Limonia nigricuspis Alexander, 1938 w
 Limonia nigrirostris (Gimmerthal, 1847) w
 Limonia nigroclavata Alexander, 1942 i
 Limonia nigronitida Alexander, 1923 w
 Limonia nigropolita (Alexander) i g
 Limonia nigropunctata intermixta Savchenko, 1976 w
 Limonia nigropunctata (Schummel, 1829) c g
 Limonia nitida (Verrall, 1886) w
 Limonia nitobei (Edwards, 1916) c g
 Limonia niveipes (Brunetti, 1912) c g
 Limonia nominata Alexander, 1936 c g
 Limonia novaeangliae Alexander, 1929 i b
 Limonia nubeculosa Meigen, 1804 c g
 Limonia nussbaumi Stary and Freidberg, 2007 c g
 Limonia nycteris (Alexander, 1927) i
 Limonia obsoleta (Meigen, 1818) w
 Limonia obtusistyla Alexander, 1925 i
 Limonia ocellata (von Roder, 1886) c g
 Limonia omniflava Alexander, 1936 c g
 Limonia oosterbroeki Stary, 2017 w
 Limonia opacipennis Stary, 2017 w
 Limonia orthorhabda Alexander, 1940 i
 Limonia ozarkensis Alexander, 1968 i
 Limonia pabulina (Meigen, 1818) g
 Limonia pacata Alexander, 1930 c g
 Limonia pacatella Alexander, 1934 c g
 Limonia pacatina Edwards, 1933 c g
 Limonia paitae Alexander, 1948 w
 Limonia pallida (Macquart, 1838) w
 Limonia pallidipleura Alexander, 1924 c g
 Limonia pannonica (Kowarz, 1868) c g
 Limonia parapentheres Alexander, 1948 i
 Limonia parietina (Osten Sacken, 1861) i c g b
 Limonia particeps (Doane, 1908) i
 Limonia parvipennis Alexander, 1940 c g
 Limonia parvispiculata Alexander, 1934 c g
 Limonia pennsylvanica (Dietz, 1921) i g
 Limonia penumbrata Edwards, 1932 c g
 Limonia peramabilis Alexander, 1967 c g
 Limonia perbeata Alexander, 1938 c g
 Limonia perdistincta Alexander, 1979 c g
 Limonia perextensa Alexander, 1971 c g
 Limonia perfecta (Alexander, 1928) i
 Limonia perissoptera Alexander, 1962 c g
 Limonia perkinsi (Grimshaw) i g
 Limonia pernigrina Alexander, 1938 c g
 Limonia pernodosa Alexander, 1965 c g
 Limonia perproducta Alexander, 1967 c g
 Limonia perserena Alexander, 1946 i
 Limonia phalangioides Alexander, 1943 i
 Limonia phragmitidis (Schrank, 1781) c g
 Limonia pia Podenas and Podeniene, 2017 w
 Limonia pilosicaudata Alexander, 1931 c g
 Limonia piscataquis Alexander, 1941 i
 Limonia platyptera (Macquart, 1826) w
 Limonia platyterga Alexander, 1956 c g
 Limonia pondoensis Alexander, 1930 c g
 Limonia praepostera (Alexander, 1925) i
 Limonia pristomera Alexander, 1972 c
 Limonia procericornis Alexander, 1978 c g
 Limonia profunda (Alexander, 1925) i
 Limonia prolixicornis Alexander, 1931 c g
 Limonia prolixisetosa Alexander, 1971 c g
 Limonia pronotalis Alexander, 1931 c g
 Limonia propior Alexander, 1963 c g
 Limonia proxima Kuntze, 1920 w
 Limonia prudentia Alexander, 1935 c g
 Limonia pubipennis Osten Sacken i g
 Limonia pudica (Osten Sacken, 1859) i
 Limonia pudicoides Alexander, 1929 i
 Limonia pullata aquila Savchenko, 1983 w
 Limonia pullata Alexander, 1924 c g
 Limonia punctigera (Walker, 1856) w
 Limonia pygmea (Macquart, 1838) c g
 Limonia quantilla Alexander, 1934 c g
 Limonia raiateaae Alexander, 1947 c g
 Limonia rantaiensis Alexander, 1929 c g
 Limonia rapida Alexander, 1946 i
 Limonia rara (Osten Sacken, 1869) i
 Limonia ravida (Alexander, 1925) i
 Limonia reticulata (Alexander, 1912) i
 Limonia rostrata (Say, 1823) i b
 Limonia rostrifera (Osten Sacken, 1869) i
 Limonia sanguinea (Doleschall, 1857) c g
 Limonia sannionis Alexander, 1967 c g
 Limonia scabristyla Alexander, 1968 i
 Limonia schwarzi (Alexander, 1912) i
 Limonia sciophila (Osten Sacken, 1877) w
 Limonia serandi (Alexander, 1919) c g
 Limonia serpula Alexander, 1967 c g
 Limonia sexnotata (Schummel, 1829) w
 Limonia sexpunctata (Fabricius, 1781) w
 Limonia shannoni Alexander i g b
 Limonia shelfordi Alexander, 1944 i
 Limonia shushna Alexander, 1952 c g
 Limonia simulans (Walker, 1848) i
 Limonia sociabilis (Osten Sacken, 1869) i c g
 Limonia solitaria (Osten Sacken, 1869) i
 Limonia soradida (Brunetti, 1912) g
 Limonia sphagnicola (Alexander, 1925) i
 Limonia spinifera (Alexander, 1927) i
 Limonia splendens Kuntze, 1920 c g
 Limonia stenolabis Alexander, 1965 c g
 Limonia stigma (Meigen, 1818) c g
 Limonia stigmata (Doane, 1900) i
 Limonia stoneri Alexander, 1925 c g
 Limonia striopleura (Edwards, 1919) c g
 Limonia stulta (Osten Sacken, 1859) i
 Limonia stygipennis (Alexander) i
 Limonia subaequalis Savchenko, 1979 c g
 Limonia subhostilis Alexander, 1935 c g
 Limonia submurcida Alexander, 1968 c g
 Limonia subnubeculosa (Alexander, 1920) w
 Limonia subpacata Alexander, 1931 c g
 Limonia subprolixa Alexander, 1931 c g
 Limonia sudetica Czizek, 1931 w
 Limonia suffusca (Garrett, 1922) i
 Limonia swezeyi (Alexander) i
 Limonia sylvicola (Schummel, 1829) c g
 Limonia synempora Alexander, 1933 c g
 Limonia syrma Alexander, 1978 c g
 Limonia tagax Alexander, 1954 c g
 Limonia talungensis Alexander, 1971 c g
 Limonia tanakai (Alexander, 1921) c g
 Limonia tanyrhyncha Alexander, 1965 c g
 Limonia tattakae Alexander, 1923 g
 Limonia taurica (Strobl, 1895) c g
 Limonia terraenovae Alexander, 1920 i g
 Limonia terrestris (Linnaeus, 1758) w
 Limonia tessellatipennis Alexander, 1936 c g
 Limonia thaleitrichia Alexander, 1979 c g
 Limonia thanatos Alexander, 1949 c g
 Limonia tigriventris Alexander, 1968 c g
 Limonia triarmata Alexander, 1930 g
 Limonia tributaria Alexander, 1943 w
 Limonia tricornis Alexander i g
 Limonia triocellata (Osten Sacken, 1859) i b
 Limonia triphaea (Alexander, 1954) b
 Limonia tripunctata (Zetterstedt, 1838) w
 Limonia tristigma (Osten Sacken, 1860) w
 Limonia trivittata (Schummel, 1829) c g
 Limonia turpis (Walker, 1856) w
 Limonia tuta Alexander, 1935 c g
 Limonia ubensis Alexander, 1930 c g
 Limonia uinta Alexander, 1948 i
 Limonia uliginosa Alexander, 1929 i g
 Limonia umbrata (Brunetti, 1911) g
 Limonia uniaculeata Alexander, 1956 c g
 Limonia unimaculata (Macquart, 1826) w
 Limonia vaillanti Thomas, 1968 w
 Limonia vajra Alexander, 1958 c g
 Limonia valverdensis Alexander, 1946 i
 Limonia vanduzeei (Alexander, 1916) i
 Limonia variabilis (Grimshaw) i
 Limonia varipes (Dietz, 1921) w
 Limonia venerabilis Alexander, 1938 w
 Limonia venustula (Alexander, 1921) c
 Limonia vibhishana Alexander, 1965 c g
 Limonia virescens (Loew, 1851) i
 Limonia viridicolor Alexander, 1955 c g
 Limonia viridula (Alexander, 1922) g
 Limonia viticola Alexander, 1978 c g
 Limonia vitripennis (Brunetti, 1912) w
 Limonia vormanni (Westhoff, 1882) w
 Limonia vulgata (Bergroth, 1888) i
 Limonia walleyi Alexander, 1942 i
 Limonia whartoni (Needham, 1908) i
 Limonia willamettensis Alexander, 1949 i
 Limonia woosnami (Alexander, 1920) c g
 Limonia yakushimensis Alexander, 1930 c g
 Limonia yapicola Alexander, 1972 c g
 Limonia yellowstonensis Alexander, 1945 i c g
 Limonia yeranda Theischinger, 1994 c g
 Limonia ypsilon Alexander, 1959 i
 Limonia zebrina Savchenko, 1979 w
 Limonia zionana Alexander, 1948 i
 Limonia zwicki Devyatkov, 2012 c g

Data sources: i = ITIS, c = Catalogue of Life, g = GBIF, b = Bugguide.net, w = Catalogue of the Craneflies of the World

Species with uncertain placement in Limonia

 Limonia arthritica Alexander, 1936
 Limonia atroaurata Alexander, 1931
 Limonia bilan Alexander, 1931
 Limonia calcarifera Alexander, 1936
 Limonia chaseni Edwards, 1933
 Limonia congesta Alexander, 1967
 Limonia costalis (Wiedemann, 1824)
 Limonia dactylolabis (Alexander, 1921)
 Limonia desiderata Alexander, 1932
 Limonia flavoterminalis (Alexander, 1922)
 Limonia iridescens (Edwards, 1912)
 Limonia kuschei Alexander, 1958
 Limonia latiorflava Alexander, 1966
 Limonia longivena (Edwards, 1911)
 Limonia luteipostica Alexander, 1965
 Limonia luteivittata Alexander, 1930
 Limonia monilis Alexander, 1932
 Limonia multinodulosa Alexander, 1930
 Limonia negativa Edwards, 1933
 Limonia ocellata (von Roder, 1886)
 Limonia parvispiculata Alexander, 1934
 Limonia pernodosa Alexander, 1965
 Limonia pilosicaudata Alexander, 1931
 Limonia pondoensis Alexander, 1930
 Limonia pygmea (Macquart, 1838)
 Limonia sanguinea (Doleschall, 1857)
 Limonia shushna Alexander, 1952
 Limonia thanatos Alexander, 1949
 Limonia tigriventris Alexander, 1968
 Limonia tuta Alexander, 1935
 Limonia vibhishana Alexander, 1965
 Limonia viridicolor Alexander, 1955
 Limonia yellowstonensis Alexander, 1945

References

Limonia